The Major League Soccer All-Star Game is an annual soccer game held by Major League Soccer featuring selected players from the league against an international club or selected players from Liga MX. MLS initially adopted a traditional all-star game format used by other North American sports leagues where the Eastern Conference squared off against the Western Conference. This eventually evolved into the current system where the league annually invites a club from abroad to play against a league all-star team in a friendly match. The MLS All-Stars hold a 9–7 record in the competition marking the season's midpoint. Players are awarded roster spots through a combination of fan voting and selections by the appointed manager and league commissioner.

In case of a tie after full-time, the game does not use a 30-minute extra time period; instead it goes straight to a penalty shoot-out. The match is preceded by a skills challenge tournament, which was introduced in 2018 and features three-player teams competing in various events. The All-Star Game also runs parallel to the Major League Soccer Homegrown Game, which debuted in 2014.

History

Major League Soccer's first all-star game was played at Giants Stadium in the summer of 1996. The game, using an East–West format with players handpicked by the coaching staffs to emulate other American leagues, was the first game of a doubleheader with the Brazilian national team defeating a team of FIFA World All-Stars. The matchup between divisions would only be used for six seasons as MLS tried experimenting with different formats. The 1998 All-Star Game placed a team of American MLS players against MLS players from abroad. The 2002 game, the first to use a league-wide all-star team, was the only game to feature a national team opponent.

Since then (except in 2004), every opponent has been a foreign club invited by the league. The MLS All-Stars won their first six games before falling to Everton in penalties in 2009. All games from 2005 to 2019 have been against teams from Europe, the majority of which have been from England's Premier League. The European league schedule runs from fall to spring, allowing for a fixture against the MLS All-Stars during the preseasons of teams. The 2020 All-Star Game was to be the first to feature the all-star team from another league, Liga MX; however, that game was cancelled.

In August 2005, an 18-player all-star team squad named the "MLS Select Team" competed in the Trofeo Santiago Bernabéu, a friendly hosted by Real Madrid at the Santiago Bernabéu Stadium in Madrid. The All-Star team, coached by Steve Nicol, lost 5–0 after being given only two days to prepare between normal league matches.

The roster is chosen using a mix of fan votes, nominations from the coach, and commissioner's pick. Some players, including English midfielders Steven Gerrard and Frank Lampard in 2015, have been picked to participate in the All-Star Game despite not playing in club matches. Players who are picked to play in the All-Star Game but refuse to join the team are suspended from one league match.

Roster
For 2014, ten players were chosen by All-Star Game coach Caleb Porter, eleven players were chosen by fan voting (subject to Porter's approval), and two were selected by MLS commissioner Don Garber.

Skills Challenge

The modern incarnation of the MLS All-Star Skills Challenge, introduced in 2018, is a freestyle soccer event that features three-player teams competing against each other in minigames, including a touch-and-volley goal showcase, a shooting accuracy competition, and a passing-and-shooting challenge. The older version of the skills challenge was retired in 2001 and featured other events, including "goalie wars" and soccer tennis.

Results by team

Notes

Results by nation

Results by year

"East vs. West" (1996–1997)

"MLS USA vs. MLS World" (1998)

"East vs. West" (1999–2001)

"All-Stars vs. Guest" (2002–2003)

"East vs. West" (2004)

"All-Stars vs. Europe" (2005–2019)

"All-Stars vs. Liga MX All-Stars" (2021–present)

Future All-Star Games

Most Valuable Player

Television coverage

Since 2015, English-language rights for the MLS All-Star Game have alternated between ESPN and Fox. In even numbered years, ESPN has broadcast the All-Star Game while Fox would broadcast the MLS Cup. Likewise, in odd numbered years, Fox would be slated to broadcast the All-Star Game while ESPN or its sister network, ABC beginning in 2019, would broadcast the MLS Cup. This arrangement will stay in place until at least the 2022 season.

References

 
All-star games
All-Star Game
Recurring sporting events established in 1996
1996 establishments in the United States
Representative teams of association football leagues